Chet Baker Sings Again is an album by trumpeter/vocalist Chet Baker which was recorded in 1985 and released on the Dutch Timeless label.

Track listing 
 "All of You" (Cole Porter) – 4:40
 "Body and Soul" (Johnny Green, Edward Heyman, Robert Sour, Frank Eyton) – 6:31
 "Look for the Silver Lining" (Jerome Kern, Buddy DeSylva) – 3:52
 "I Can't Get Started" (Vernon Duke, Ira Gershwin) – 6:54
 "My Funny Valentine" (Richard Rodgers, Lorenz Hart) – 7:15
 "Alone Together" (Arthur Schwartz, Howard Dietz) – 6:13
 "Someone to Watch Over Me" (George Gershwin, Ira Gershwin) – 5:20
 "How Deep Is the Ocean?" (Irving Berlin) – 3:48

Personnel 
Chet Baker – trumpet, vocals
Michel Graillier – piano
Ricardo del Fra – bass
John Engels – drums

References 

Chet Baker albums
1986 albums
Timeless Records albums